Pir Hayati may refer to:

Pir Hayati, Hamadan
Pir Hayati, Kermanshah
Pir Hayati-ye Olya, Kermanshah Province
Pir Hayati-ye Sofla, Kermanshah Province
Pir Hayati-ye Vosta, Kermanshah Province
Pir Hayati, Lorestan